Guntars is a Latvian masculine given name and may refer to:
Guntars Antoms (born 1960), Latvian chess international master
Guntars Deičmans (born 1983), Latvian swimmer
Guntars Krasts (born 1957), Latvian politician; former prime minister of Latvia
Guntars Mankus (born 1969), Latvian orienteer, rogainer and adventure racer
Guntars Silagailis (born 1984), Latvian professional footballer

References

Latvian masculine given names